is a 25-episode anime TV series that aired on TV Tokyo from October 6, 2000, to March 22, 2001, with the final episode, releasing direct-to-video.

The anime was originally licensed by Bandai Entertainment in North America before going out of print in 2012. Following the 2012 closure of Bandai Entertainment, Sunrise announced at Otakon 2013, that Sentai Filmworks has rescued Argento Soma, along with a handful of other former BEI titles.

Plot 
In an effort to learn more about the metallic aliens that have been plaguing the planet for the past years, Dr. Noguchi and his assistant Maki Agata try to bring to life a construct pieced together from the destroyed aliens. They recruit Takuto Kaneshiro, Maki's boyfriend at the college they both attend, into this project because of his talent for metallurgy. While Takuto is unhappy with Maki keeping secrets from him again, he reluctantly helps with the project. However, in the process of reviving the monster that Dr. Noguchi has aptly called Frank (short for Frankenstein's monster), unidentified soldiers invade the MORGUE facility. They cut the power, leading to a power surge which violently brings Frank to life and causes an explosion that kills everyone, including Dr. Noguchi and Maki, in the facility, except Takuto.

"Mr. X" visits the scarred (emotionally and physically) Takuto in the hospital, and offers him a chance to get his vengeance on the monster he blames for killing Maki and destroying his life. Months later Lt. Ryu Soma is reborn from the ashes of Takuto's soul, as a military pilot who joins FUNERAL. This is the organization which deals with the attacking aliens, and has also recaptured Frank (who escaped after the explosion at MORGUE).

It quickly becomes clear that Ryu knows how to operate FUNERAL's SARGs. Suspicions arises from Dan as Ryu has more in his background than meets the eyes.

It quickly becomes clear that Frank has become the best weapon FUNERAL has to defend against the aliens, which leaves Ryu torn between revenge and the desire to protect his comrades. Further complicating the picture, the only person who can communicate with Frank is a young girl named Hattie (Harriet), who bears a striking resemblance to Ryu/Takuto's lost love Maki. As it becomes apparent that Frank is more than a simple monster, Ryu and his FUNERAL comrades have to come to terms with questions of human identity, grief, and loss.

Cast

Japanese cast
 Houko Kuwashima as Harriet "Hattie" Bartholomew/Maki Agata
 Souichiro Hoshi as Takuto Kaneshiro/Ryu Soma
 Jouji Nakata as Michael Heartland
 Kikuko Inoue as Guinevere Green
 Sayuri as Lana Ines
 Takehito Koyasu as Dan Simmonds
 Yūji Takada as Frank, Yuri Leonov, Defense Official, Henry Harris
 Yui Horie as Sue Harris
 Mitsuaki Madono as the Sheriff

English cast 
 Stephen Apostolina - Army Official B
 Beau Billingslea - Captain Michael Heartland
 Richard Cansino - Mr. X (or Edward Lawrence)
 Dorothy Elias-Fahn - Maki Agata
 Lynn Fischer - P.A., Kroka Leonov
 Sandy Fox - Harriet 'Hattie' Bartholomew
 Crispin Freeman - Morgue Military Official, First Lt. Dan Simmons
 Steve Kramer - Funeral Board, Army Official A, Astronomer, Cook
 Lex Lang - Frank
 Wendee Lee - Joan
 Dave Mallow - Bird House Operator, Guard, Doctor, Defense Man B, Base Guard, Ulysses Transmission, Ground Control, Additional Voices
 Michael McConnohie - Funeral Unit Commander, Dignitary A, General
 Mary Elizabeth McGlynn - Countdown Announcement, Stacey, News Anchor, Apartment Super, Scarlet, Auntie
 Lara Jill Miller - Second Lt. Sue Harris
 Tony Oliver - Gate Guard, Border Patrol Pilot B, Dr. Takahashi, Air Force Official B
 Paul St. Peter - Morgue Officer
 Tony Pope - Official
 Simon Prescott - Air Force Official A, Scientist A
 Jamieson Price - Base Alert, Funeral Board, Government Man, Colonel Kilgore, Control Tower
 Derek Stephen Prince - Lab Assistant B
 Michelle Ruff - Narrator, Reporter, Funeral Operator, Nurse (voice: English version)
 Philece Sampler - Ai, Elaine Symond, Secretary (voice: English version)
 Melodee Spevack - Commander Lana Ines
 Steve Staley -  Takuto Kaneshiro/Second Lt. Ryu Soma
 Doug Stone - Dr. Ernest Noguchi
 Julie Ann Taylor - Joan #2, Amian
 Paula Mattiloi Walker - First Lt Guinevere Green
 Dave Wittenberg - Sheriff
 Tom Wyner - UN Officer, Grandpa

Episode list

Music

OP Single - Silent Wind

The single album to the opening song

Original Soundtrack I

First OST Album

Original Soundtrack II

Second OST Album

Image Album - "if" For the Future Lovers

Contains songs not in the main soundtrack.

References

External links 
 
 

2000 anime television series debuts
2002 anime OVAs
Adventure anime and manga
Anime with original screenplays
Bandai Entertainment anime titles
Mecha anime and manga
Odex
Sentai Filmworks
Sunrise (company)